Capital punishment was abolished in Guam in 1976.

When the area was ruled by Spain, capital crimes were punished by firing squad. After the island was acquired by the United States, condemned criminals were hanged. During the World War II Japanese occupation, Kenpeitai executed insurgents and resisters by various means. After the island was acquired by the United States, 14 Japanese war criminals were hanged by the United States Navy between 1947 and 1949. 

Before 1966, first-degree murder was a crime punishable by death. Gradually, death sentences were restricted over time in Guam, with the only capital crime during and after 1966 consisting of the murder of a peace officer. This list was expanded in 1970 to include those who killed the territorial governor, lieutenant governor, or a political candidate.

The Guam Legislature abolished capital punishment following an overhaul of Guam's statutes by the Guam Law Revision Commission.

See also 
 Capital punishment in the United States

References 

S
Death in Guam
Guamanian law